Ida Degrande (born 5 February 1910, date of death unknown) was a Belgian middle-distance runner. In 1924 the participated in the 1924 Women's Olympiad winning the bronze medal in running 1000 metres. She competed in the women's 800 metres at the 1928 Summer Olympics.

References

External links
 

1910 births
Year of death missing
Athletes (track and field) at the 1928 Summer Olympics
Belgian female middle-distance runners
Olympic athletes of Belgium
Place of birth missing
Women's World Games medalists
20th-century Belgian women